Belting may refer to:

 Belting (beating), the act of using a belt as an instrument of physical punishment
 Belting (music), a technique for singing loud high notes with the chest register
 Belt (mechanical), belts looped over pulleys

People with the surname
 George B. Belting, American politician
 Hans Belting (1935-2023), German art historian